Zulfiya Gabidullina (born 22 November 1965) is a Kazakhstani Paralympic swimmer who competes in the S4 category. She previously competed in the S3 class but was reclassified into  S4, a class for athletes with more physical ability compared to S3. At the 2016 Summer Paralympics, aged 50, she won a gold medal in the 100 m freestyle, improving her own world record, and bringing Kazakhstan its only gold medal at the Paralympics. Gabidullina became disabled at the age of five. She is a businesswoman. She took up competitive swimming in 2007 and qualified for the 2012 Paralympics and 2013 and 2015 world championships.

Results
https://olympics.com/tokyo-2020/paralympic-games/en/results/swimming/athlete-profile-n1570356-gabidullina-zulfiya.htm

Paralympic Games
1	100m Freestyle - S3	2016	Rio de Janeiro, BRA	1:30.07

4	50m Freestyle - S4	2016	Rio de Janeiro, BRA	42.24

6	50m Backstroke - S3	2016	Rio de Janeiro, BRA	1:00.68

7	150m Individual Medley - SM4	2016	Rio de Janeiro, BRA	3:25.30

12	50m Breaststroke - SB3	2016	Rio de Janeiro, BRA	1:19.01

12	50m Backstroke - S4	2012	London, GBR	1:10.12

World Championships
1	50m Freestyle - S3	2017	Mexico City, MEX	42.87

2	100m Freestyle - S3	2017	Mexico City, MEX	1:40.21

2	50m Freestyle - S3	2013	Montreal, QC, CAN	47.79

3	50m Freestyle - S4	2015	Glasgow, GBR	48.18

3	100m Freestyle - S3	2015	Glasgow, GBR	1:46.11

3	100m Freestyle - S3	2013	Montreal, QC, CAN	1:45.41

3	50m Backstroke - S3	2013	Montreal, QC, CAN	1:11.53

4	150m Individual Medley - SM3	2013	Montreal, QC, CAN	3:47.45

5	50m Backstroke - S3	2017	Mexico City, MEX	1:13.96

6	100m Freestyle - S4	2019	London, GBR	1:39.81

7	50m Freestyle - S4	2019	London, GBR	44.92

7	Mixed 4 x 50m Medley Relay 20 Points	2019	London, GBR	3:01.53

10	200m Freestyle - S5	2015	Glasgow, GBR	3:43.43

10	50m Backstroke - S3	2015	Glasgow, GBR	1:16.30

10	50m Breaststroke - SB3	2015	Glasgow, GBR	1:25.85

10	150m Individual Medley - SM4	2015	Glasgow, GBR	3:41.50

11	200m Freestyle - S5	2019	London, GBR	3:46.78

11	150m Individual Medley - SM4	2019	London, GBR	4:00.39

13	50m Backstroke - S4	2019	London, GBR	1:11.93

13	100m Breaststroke - SB4	2019	London, GBR	3:38.76

Asian Para Games
1	100m Freestyle - S4	2018	Jakarta, INA	1:47.27

2	50m Freestyle - S4	2018	Jakarta, INA	45.51

2	50m Backstroke - S4	2018	Jakarta, INA	1:17.72

3	200m Freestyle - S5	2018	Jakarta, INA	3:29.37

European Championships
6	100m Freestyle - S4	2020	Funchal, POR	1:50.48

6	150m Individual Medley - SM4	2020	Funchal, POR	4:01.86

7	50m Freestyle - S4	2020	Funchal, POR	49.01

12	50m Breaststroke - SB3	2020	Funchal, POR	1:40.29

DSQ	50m Backstroke - S4	2020	Funchal, POR	DSQ

References 

1965 births
Living people
Kazakhstani female backstroke swimmers
Kazakhstani female breaststroke swimmers
Kazakhstani female freestyle swimmers
Kazakhstani female medley swimmers
Swimmers at the 2012 Summer Paralympics
Swimmers at the 2016 Summer Paralympics
Medalists at the 2016 Summer Paralympics
Paralympic gold medalists for Kazakhstan
Medalists at the World Para Swimming Championships
Paralympic medalists in swimming
S3-classified Paralympic swimmers
People from Taraz
21st-century Kazakhstani women
Medalists at the 2018 Asian Para Games